The Jauer is a river of Saxony, Germany. It is a right tributary of the Schwarze Elster, which it joins near Kamenz.

See also
List of rivers of Saxony

Rivers of Saxony
Rivers of Germany